Dianne de Las Casas (January 15, 1970 – August 21, 2017) was an award-winning Philippine-born American author and storyteller who toured internationally. She was the founder of an international initiative designating November as Picture Book Month.

Awards
Storytelling World Resource Award (2005, 2010, 2011) 
National Parenting Publications Award (2006)

Bibliography

Children's books
The Cajun Cornbread Boy (2009)
Madame Poulet and Monsieur Roach (2009)
Mama's Bayou (2010) 
The Gigantic Sweet Potato (2010)
There's a Dragon in the Library (2011)
The House That Witchy Built (2011) 
Blue Frog: The Legend of Chocolate (2011)
Beware, Beware of the Big Bad Bear (2012)
Dinosaur Mardi Gras (2012)
The Little "Read" Hen (2013)

Other books
Story Fest: Crafting Story Theater Scripts (2005)
Kamishibai Story Theater: The Art of Picture Telling (2006)
Handmade Tales: Stories to Make and Take (2008) 
The Story Biz Handbook: How to Manage Your Storytelling Career from the Desk to the Stage (2008)
Tangram Tales: Story Theater Using the Ancient Chinese Puzzle (2009)
Scared Silly: 25 Tales to Tickle and Thrill (2009) 
Stories on Board: Creating Board Games from Favorite Tales (2010)
A Is for Alligator: Draw and Tell Tales from A-Z (2011)
Tell Along Tales! Playing with Participation Stories (2011)
Tales from the 7,000 Isles: Filipino Folk Stories (2011)
Handmade Tales 2: More Stories to Make and Take (2013)

References

External links

Picture Book Month website - Dianne de Las Casas, Founder

1970 births
2017 deaths
American storytellers
Women storytellers
American writers of Filipino descent
Filipino emigrants to the United States